Date at Midnight is a 1959 British crime film from the Danzigers.

Plot
American journalist Bob Dillon (Paul Carpenter) arrives in England and finds himself helping to solve a murder involving the nephew of a lawyer, who has been wrongly accused.

Cast
Paul Carpenter as Bob Dillon
Jean Aubrey as Paula Burroughs
Harriett Johns as Lady Leyton
Ralph Michael as Sir Edward Leyton
John Charlesworth as	Tommy
Philip Ray as	Jenkins
Howard Lang as	Inspector
Robert Ayres as Gordon Baines

Critical reception
TV Guide called it "Competent, though no more."

References

External links

1959 films
British crime films
Films shot at New Elstree Studios
1950s English-language films
1950s British films